Bajakhana is a small village in Faridkot district in the Indian state of Punjab.

Location
The village of Bajakhana lies between Kotkapura and Bathinda stretch of National Highway 54 in Faridkot district of the state Punjab.

Nearby cities and towns
 Jaitu	   9.8 km.
 Goniana	   16.9 km.
 Bathinda     26.4 km.
 Bhisiana     28.5 km.
 Faridkot     32.5 km.

Notable personalities
 Harjeet Brar Bajakhana (5 September 1971 – 16 April 1998), a professional kabbadi player

References

Villages in Faridkot district